Theodor V. Ionescu (February 8, 1899 – November 7, 1988) was a Romanian physicist and inventor who made remarkable discoveries in plasma physics, ionosphere physics, ion coupling electrons in dense plasmas, masers, magnetron amplifiers, and Zeeman effects related to controlled nuclear fusion and quantum emission mechanisms in hot plasmas. He was a member of the Romanian Academy from December 21, 1935.

Ph.D. studies in plasma physics
He received his Ph.D. in plasma physics, first in Paris at Paris-Sorbonne University, and then in Iași. Thus, the history of plasma physics in Romania began in 1923 with the defense of the first PhD thesis in physics at the University of Iași by Ionescu, under the guidance of Petru Bogdan. Ionescu carried out the first experimental studies in Romania of the physics of ionized gases/plasmas.

Scientific achievements and collaborators
In 1925 invented a microphone based on thermionic currents (currents emitted by heated bodies) and a light projector using the interference phenomenon.

Founded in the same year the first Electricity and Magnetism Laboratory, as well as the first Chair of Electricity and Magnetism in the Department of Mathematics and Physics at the University of Bucharest.

The first prototype of a precursor to the magnetron power amplifier
He built in 1934–1935 a precursor to the high-power, multi-cavity magnetron that was built subsequently, in 1937–1940, by the British physicist, Sir John Turton Randall, FRSE together with a team of British coworkers for the British and American, military radar installations in WWII. At the same time, the Telefunken Company of Berlin was 'searching' for such a device but has apparently met with much less success than the British inventors or Th. V. Ionescu. (However, the split anode magnetron had first been developed in 1921 by Dr. A.E.Hull at General Electric Company in USA; also in 1921, Ernst Haban, who was working in Germany, developed a similar device that worked on a 3 cm wavelength. A strong competitor of the former inventors was also Dr. H.E.Hollman who registered many patents between 1925 and 1935 that documented devices related to magnetron development).

Patents
In 1936, he obtained a patent for the 3D imaging in cinema and television. In 1946, together with physicist V. Mihu invented and built a maser-type device.

Discoveries
He worked in the early 1960s in the Laboratory of the Bucharest Institute of Plasma Physics together with his childhood friend,  Octav Gheorghiu, whom he greatly respected for his exceptional human qualities. They studied systematically the resonant frequencies of molecular oxygen and hydrogen ions. Then, they published their most important experimental results in a series of articles in C. R. Acad. Sci. Paris".(pp. 245, 898, 957, 246, pp. 2250, 3598, 1958, 250, 2182 p. 1960, 252, p. 870, 1961) and Rev Roum. Phys.In the early 1970s, together with physicists Radu Pârvan and J. C. Băianu - one of his Ph.D. research assistants in plasma physics in magnetic fields in the Electricity Department of the Faculty of Physics, Bucharest – Ionescu completed experiments on controlled magnetic resonance oscillations in ultra-hot plasmas. Such seminal experiments involved the coupling of ionic and electronic oscillations in ultra-hot plasma involving quantum amplified stimulation processes in the presence of longitudinal magnetic fields which opened novel possibilities for achieving hot nuclear fusion in the future (Achieving nuclear fusion in high pressure hot plasma). The first report of these research results was presented at the French Academy of Science in Paris by Louis Néel, member of the Academy and Nobel Prize in Physics for Magnetism. Additional results were then published in the same year in the internationally renowned magazine C. R. Acad. Sci. Paris.

His successor as Head of Department in 1970 was Florin Ciorăscu, "imported" from the IFA, (who died in 1977 during the major earthquake in Bucharest).

Notes

References
 Th.V.Ionescu. Electricity and Magnetism. "Electricitate şi Magnetism". "Electricity and Magnetism". Course Notes., School of Physics, University of Bucharest., 1960.
 Th.V.Ionescu et al. (1969). "Les oscillations ioniques dans les cathodes creuses dans un champ magnetique.", transmise par M. Louis Neel, C. R. Acad. Sci. Paris, 270: 1321–1324,
 Gh. Popa, L. Sîrghi, Fundamentals of plasma physics (Bazele fizicii plasmei), Ed. Univ.Course Notes., Department of Physics, University of Bucharest., 1960.Romanian personalities of science and technology – the dictionary, Scientific and Encyclopaedic Publishing House, Bucharest, 1982
 Ioan Ioviţ Popescu, D. Ciobotaru, Bazele fizicii plasmei., Ed. Tehnică, București, 1987.
 D.Alexandroaei, Special Chapters in Plasma Physics. (Capitole speciale de fizica plasmei.), Ed. Univ."Al.I.Cuza", Iasi, 2000.
 Nicoleta Dumitrascu, Introduction to plasma physics (Introducere în fizica plasmei.), Ed Junimea 1999 * John Ioviţă Popescu, D. Ciobotaru, "Fundamentals of plasma physics", Technical Publishing House, Bucharest, 1987.
 Personalităţi româneşti ale ştiinţelor naturii şi tehnicii – dicţionar'', Ed. Ştiinţifică şi Enciclopedică, București, 1982

External links
 US2123728 (A) Patent

Romanian physicists
20th-century Romanian inventors
Titular members of the Romanian Academy
Alexandru Ioan Cuza University alumni
People from Dorohoi
1899 births
1988 deaths
Members of the Romanian Academy of Sciences
Paris-Sorbonne University alumni